Bhavanpura is a village in Govardhan Tehsil in the Indian state of Uttar Pradesh. Bhawanpura  is a village in Goverdan tehsil of Mathura district of Indian state of Uttar Pradesh. It is located about 22 km far from its District. i.e. Mathura

Location 
It is located 21 km west of Mathura, which is the district headquarters, and 407 km from state capital Lucknow.

Rail 
Goverdhan Railway Station is the nearest railway station to Bhavanpura. Mathura Junction railway station is a major railway station situated 19 km away.

Road

Education

Colleges 
 Maa Sntoshi Devi Inter College Ading, Mathura

Schools 
The schools nearby are:
 R Kj.h.s. Areeng
 Jhs.nagla Ganthouli
 Jhs.malhoo

References 

Villages in Mathura district